Pountney is a surname, and may refer to:

 Budge Pountney (born 1973), British rugby union player and coach
 Christine Pountney (born 1971), Canadian author
 Dave Pountney (born 1939), English footballer
 David Pountney (born 1947), British-Polish theatre and opera director
 Graham Pountney (born 1953), British actor
 Culture Shock (musician), born James Pountney, British DJ and record producer

See also
 Samuel Pountney Smith (1812–1883), English architect
 Pountney Hill House, a building in London, UK
 St Laurence Pountney, a former church in London